The New Zealand Barbarians, nicknamed the "Baa-Baas", are an invitational rugby union team. They have been a part of New Zealand rugby since the team was founded in 1937 by two ex-All Blacks, Ronald Bush and Hubert McLean, who captained their first game (against Auckland) in 1938.

The club is based in New Zealand, at Eden Park in Auckland. The idea came from the concept of the Barbarian F.C.

Playing kit and symbol
The New Zealand Barbarians wear scarlet red jerseys with white shorts. The symbol of the team is a white leaping lamb.

2017 squad
Provincial Barbarians squad to play the British and Irish Lions on 3 June 2017.

 Head Coach –  Clayton McMillan

Representatives

 Kevin Boroevich
 Jonah Lomu
 Andrew Mehrtens
 Christian Cullen
 Ian Jones
 Mark Donaldson (1977)
 Sean Fitzpatrick
 Grant Fox
 John Kirwan
 Taine Randell
 Xavier Rush
 Wilson Whineray
 John Afoa
 Rene Ranger
 Colin Slade
 Alby Mathewson
 Rupeni Caucaunibuca
 Ben Smith

See also

Australian Barbarians
Brussels Barbarians
Fiji Barbarians
French Barbarians
South African Barbarians

References

Barbarian F.C.
International rugby union teams
Barbarian F.C.
Rugby clubs established in 1937
1937 establishments in New Zealand